is the tenth studio album by Japanese rock band Asian Kung-Fu Generation, released on March 30, 2022 through Sony Music subsidiary Ki/oon Music. The album was preceded by six singles, including Dororo, which was the opening for the anime series of the same title.

Release 
The album was released on March 30, 2022 in Japan. The album contained several features, including rappers OMSB and Rachel on the song "A Starry Night, The City Of Light". The songs "Empathy" and "Flowers" were released as a single, and were used in the film My Hero Academia: World Heroes' Mission. The songs "Dialogue" and "Furetai Tashikametai" were also released as singles in 2020.

Track listing

Personnel
Adapted from the album liner notes.

Asian Kung-Fu Generation
 Masafumi Gotoh – vocals, guitars, recording
 Kiyoshi Ijichi – drums
 Kensuke Kita – guitars, vocals
 Takahiro Yamada – bass guitar, vocals

Additional musicians
 Ryosuke Shimomura - synthesizers (tracks 4, 5, 7, 9, 10)
 Koichi Mizukami - keyboard, organ

Production
 Chris Athens – mastering
 Kenichi Koga – recording, mixing

Artwork and design
 Yutaka Kimura – design
 Yusuke Nakamura – illustration

Chart positions

References

Asian Kung-Fu Generation albums
2022 albums
Japanese-language albums
Sony Music albums